John Tautolo (born May 29, 1959) is a former American football guard. He played for the New York Giants from 1982 to 1983, the Portland Breakers in 1985 and for the Los Angeles Raiders in 1987.

References

1959 births
Living people
American football offensive guards
UCLA Bruins football players
New England Patriots players
New York Giants players
Boston/New Orleans/Portland Breakers players
Los Angeles Raiders players
National Football League replacement players